Schroon Lake is a hamlet and census-designated place (CDP) in the town of Schroon in Essex County, New York, United States. The population was 833 at the 2010 census, or just over half of the total population of the town of Schroon.

Geography
Schroon Lake CDP is located in the center of the town of Schroon, at the northern end of Schroon Lake, the water body. U.S. Route 9 is the main road through the community, while Interstate 87 passes through the western part of the CDP. The CDP extends north along US 9 to Alder Meadow Road and south to Kates Way. The closest I-87 access is from Exit 28 (NY-74), north of the hamlet or Exit 27 (South Schroon Road) to the south. US 9 leads north  to North Hudson and south the same distance to Pottersville, while I-87 leads north  to Plattsburgh and south  to Albany.

Demographics

References

Census-designated places in New York (state)
Census-designated places in Essex County, New York